Grasse station (French: Gare de Grasse) is a railway station serving Grasse, Alpes-Maritimes department, southeastern France. The station opened in 1871, and was closed after 1938 until it was rebuilt and reopened in 2005. From 1909 until 1938, the station was connected to Grasse's town centre by the Grasse Funicular. Proposals to rebuild a funicular have been ongoing since 2005.

The station is served by regional trains (TER Provence-Alpes-Côte d'Azur) to Cannes, Antibes and Nice.

See also 

 List of SNCF stations in Provence-Alpes-Côte d'Azur

References

TER Provence-Alpes-Côte-d'Azur
Railway stations in France opened in 1871
Railway stations in Alpes-Maritimes